The year 1983 in television involved some significant events.

Events

Programs
20/20 (1978–present)
60 Minutes (1968–present)
Alice (1976–1985)
All My Children (1970–2011)
American Bandstand (1952–1989)
Another World (1964–1999)
As the World Turns (1956–2010)
Battle of the Planets (1978–1985)
Benson (1979–1986)
Cagney & Lacey (1982–1988)
Candid Camera (1948–2004)
Capitol (1982–1987)
Captain Kangaroo (1955–1984)
Cheers (1982–1993)
CHiPs (1977–1983)
Dallas (1978–1991)
Days of Our Lives (1965–present)
Derrick (1974–1998)
Diff'rent Strokes (1978–1986)
Dynasty (1981–1989)
Entertainment Tonight (1981–present) 
Face the Nation (1954–present)
Falcon Crest (1981–1990)
Fame (1982–1987)
Family Feud (1976–1985, 1988–1995, 1999–present)
Family Ties (1982–1989)
Fantasy Island (1977–1984)
Fat Albert and the Cosby Kids (1972–1984)
General Hospital (1963–present)
Gimme a Break! (1981–1987)
Good Morning America (1975–present)
Guiding Light (1952–2009)
Hallmark Hall of Fame (1951–present)
Happy Days (1974–1984)
Hart to Hart (1979–1984)
Hee Haw (1969–1992)
High Performance (1983)
Hill Street Blues (1981–1987)
Knight Rider (1982–1986)
Knots Landing (1979–1993)
Late Night with David Letterman (1982–1993)
Laverne & Shirley (1976–1983)
Little House on the Prairie (1974–1983)
Magnum, P.I. (1980–1988)
M*A*S*H (1972–1983)
Masterpiece Theatre (1971–present)
Match Game–Hollywood Squares Hour (1962–1969, 1973–1984, 1990–1991, 1998–1999)
Meet the Press (1947–present)
Monday Night Football (1970–present)
Newhart (1982–1990)
Nightline (1979–present)
One Day at a Time (1975–1984)
One Life to Live (1968–2012)
Quincy, M.E. (1976–1983)
Real People (1979–1984)
Remington Steele (1982–1987)
Ryan's Hope (1975–1989)
Saturday Night Live (1975–present)
Schoolhouse Rock! (1973–1986)
Search for Tomorrow (1951–1986)
Sesame Street (1969–present)
Silver Spoons (1982–1987)
Simon & Simon (1981–1988)
Solid Gold (1980–1988)
Soul Train (1971–2006)
St. Elsewhere (1982–1988)
Tattletales (1974–1978, 1982–1984)
Taxi (1978–1983)
That's Incredible! (1980–1984)
The Dukes of Hazzard (1979–1985)
The Edge of Night (1956–1984)
The Facts of Life (1979–1988)
The Fall Guy (1981–1986)
The Jeffersons (1975–1985)
The Love Boat (1977–1986)
The P.T.L. Club (1976–1987)
The Price Is Right (1972–present)
The Today Show (1952–present)
The Tonight Show Starring Johnny Carson (1962–1992 [overall series 1954–present])
The Young and the Restless (1973–present)
This Old House (1979–present)
Three's Company (1977–1984)
Too Close for Comfort (1980–1986)
Trapper John, M.D. (1979–1986)
Truth or Consequences (1950–1988)
Wheel of Fortune (1975–1991) which adds a nighttime syndicated version in addition to the network daytime show

Debuting this year

Resuming this year

Ending this year

Changing networks

Made-for-TV movies and miniseries

Television stations

Station launches

Stations changing network affiliation

Station closures

Births

Deaths

See also
 1983 in the United States
 List of American films of 1983

References

External links 
List of 1983 American television series at IMDb